Kattakurgan is a city in the Samarqand Region of Uzbekistan. Administratively, it is a district-level city, that includes the urban-type settlement Ingichka. It has 90,600 inhabitants (2021). It is located on the road and railway between Bukhara and Samarkand.

Etymology
The name is Turkic and means "large town or kurgan".

History
The town does not appear to be of any great antiquity, although after Alexander the Great's ransacking of Marakanda (Samarkand), the center of cultural life in that part of the Zeravshan valley may briefly have shifted west to the region around Katta-Kurgan.

According to F.F. Pospelov, a fortress was built on the current site by the local saint Sufi Allahyar and his two brothers, Farhat-Atalyk and Allah-Nazar-bii, in 1684, and the town subsequently grew up around it. Modern Kattakurgan (its oldest part is the "old city") was founded in the last quarter of the 17th century (1683-1684).

It was the seat of a Bek (local Governor) under the rule of the Bukharan Manghit dynasty. In 1868, following the fall of Samarkand to the Russians and the annexation of the Upper Zeravshan Valley from Bukhara, it became the border town between Russian Turkestan and the Bukharan Emirate, and the center of a district. In 1924 both entities were dissolved by the Soviet regime, and Katta-Kurgan was incorporated in the new Uzbek SSR. It is currently the second largest city in Samarkand Region.

Demographics
The majority population of Kattakurgan is of Uzbek ethnicity. Kattakurgan previously also had a large Russian population, which is no longer the case.

Sources and further reading
 Ф.Ф. Поспелов "Материалы к Истории Самаркандской Области" Справочная Книга Самаркандской Области Выпуск X (Самарканд) (1912), pp 108–111 
 В.В. Бартольд Работы по Исторической Географии (Москва) (2002) pp 197–8, pp 287–8

References

Populated places in Samarqand Region
Cities in Uzbekistan
Samarkand Oblast